Hariharpur Gadhi  is a Gaunpalika and former village development committee in Sindhuli District in Bagmati Province of central Nepal. At the time of the 1991 Nepal census it had a population of 3,113 people living in 437 individual households.

References

External links
UN map of the municipalities of Sindhuli District

Populated places in Sindhuli District
Rural municipalities in Sindhuli District
Rural municipalities of Nepal established in 2017